Depsite tending to vote for parties in the blue bloc for Danish general elections, Horsens Municipality have only had mayors from the Social Democrats since the 2007 municipal reform.

In the 2017 election, the Social Democrats had come one seat short of an absolute majority, but would manage to win the mayor's position nonetheless.

In this election Peter Sørensen from the Social Democrats was seeking his third term. The result would see the Social Democrats once again becoming largest, depsite them losing a seat and decreasing their vote share by 4.7%. The final agreement would have Peter Sørensen continuing as mayor, as the Social Democrats, the Green Left and the Red–Green Alliance all supported him.

Electoral system
For elections to Danish municipalities, a number varying from 9 to 31 are chosen to be elected to the municipal council. The seats are then allocated using the D'Hondt method and a closed list proportional representation.
Horsens Municipality had 27 seats in 2021

Unlike in Danish General Elections, in elections to municipal councils, electoral alliances are allowed.

Electoral alliances  

Electoral Alliance 1

Electoral Alliance 2

Results

Notes

References 

Horsens